Rail transport in Nauru is used for moving calcium pyrophosphate from the island's interior to the cantilever jetties on the island's western coast. For this purpose, a 3,900 m long, 0.6096 m narrow gauge railway was built by the Pacific Phosphate Company in 1907. The line passes through the districts of Aiwo, Buada, Denigomodu, Nibok, Uaboe and Anibare.

History

The railway at Aiwo jetty was electrified in 1912, but replaced by a conveyor belt between the storage bins and the jetty head.

The gauge was upgraded to 0.9144 m narrow gauge railway by the British Phosphate Commission in 1920. In the past, steam engines were used to power the trains, but the railway is nowadays worked by diesel engines, though occasionally, a tractor is used.

With Nauru's phosphate deposits almost depleted, the future of the railway is uncertain. The trains were still running as of 2008.

Nauru's phosphate train features on several Nauru stamps, including a series from 1980 (Yvert no. 211-213) and another one from 1985 (Yvert no. 306, Scott no. 308).

The trains of Nauru have been depicted on commemorative Nauruan postage stamps.

See also
Transport in Nauru
Nauru Phosphate Corporation

External links 
 David Jehan: Tramways, Coconuts and Phosphate: A History of the Tramways of Ocean Island and Nauru. Light Railway Research Society of Australia Inc.

References

Transport in Nauru
Rail transport in Oceania by country